Kidnap Syndicate is a 1975 Italian poliziottesco film directed by Fernando Di Leo. Even being a minor work in the Di Leo's filmography, the film gained some critical attention for being an original re-interpretation of the "vigilante" subgenre.

Cast 
Luc Merenda as Mario Colella
James Mason as Engineer Filippini
Valentina Cortese as Countess Grazia Filippini
Vittorio Caprioli as Commissioner Magrini
Irina Maleeva as Lina
 Marino Masé as Pardi

Production
The film's story is credited to Galliano Juso, the producer of the film. The film's director Fernando Di Leo stated that the producer came up with the idea for the film based on kidnappings which he described as "a hot topic back then". Di Leo stated that the producer would call up the distributors in Italy to tell them the story for the film and if more of them were not interested in the story than were, it would not get made. Ernesto Gastaldi stated that despite being credited with Cesare Manzani that he himself wrote the script for the film, stating that Juso did come up with the idea for the film but that Di Leo did not write it, stating that the two just discussed the script after it was already completed with Gastaldi making adjustments where Di Leo felt the script was wrong. Gastaldi described the film as a "nasty film about nasty times".

The film was shot at Rizzoli Film in Rome and on location in Rome and Milan.

Release
Kidnap Syndicate was distributed theatrically in Italy by Medusa on 27 August 1975. The film grossed a total of 908,268,910 Italian lire domestically. Italian film historian Roberto Curti described its profit as a "moderate box office success".

Reception
Curti stated that the film was lambasted by Italian film critics. Claudio G. Fava stated in Corriere Mercantile that "all the worst defects of the worst of Italian cinema can be found in this minutely banal film" Sandro Casazza of La Stampa declared it as a "immoral and asocial film (the thread dedicated to the "silent majority" numbers a large number of titles ever since Straw Dogs)."

References

Footnotes

Sources

External links

1975 films
1970s crime drama films
1970s crime thriller films
Films directed by Fernando Di Leo
Poliziotteschi films
Crime films based on actual events
Films about child abduction
Films about families
Films about mass murder
Films about murder
Films about social class
Films scored by Luis Bacalov
Films about hostage takings
Italian crime thriller films
Italian vigilante films
Films with screenplays by Ernesto Gastaldi
1975 drama films
1970s Italian films